Jonas Magnus Thern (born 20 March 1967) is a Swedish football manager who manages Allsvenskan club IFK Värnamo. He is also a former professional player who played as a midfielder. Starting off his career with Malmö FF in 1985, he went on to represent FC Zürich, Benfica, Napoli, Roma, and Rangers before retiring in 1999. A full international between 1987 and 1997, he won 75 caps for the Sweden national team and captained the Sweden side that finished third at the 1994 FIFA World Cup. He also represented his country at the 1988 Summer Olympics, 1990 FIFA World Cup, as well as UEFA Euro 1992. He was the recipient of the 1989 Guldbollen as Sweden's best footballer of the year.

Club career
Born and raised in the town of Värnamo in southern central Sweden, Thern started his professional career in 1985 when he joined the classic Swedish club of Malmö FF, where he stayed for four years, earning him two titles in the 1986 and 1988 Allsvenskan. In 1989, he won the Guldbollen as Sweden's Footballer of the Year.

In 1989 he left for Benfica. He was part of a successful group of Scandinavian players that played for Benfica at the time, composed of Danish international Michael Manniche (1983–1987), and the Swedish "armada"; Mats Magnusson (1987–1992), Thern (1989–1992), Glenn Strömberg (1982–84) and Stefan Schwarz (1990–1994) alongside coach Sven-Göran Eriksson (1982–1984 and 1989–1992).

Thern went on to play in Italy for Napoli and Roma but moved to Scotland to join for Rangers on 1 July 1997, however, his career was cut short by injuries.

International career
For Sweden, he played in the 1990 FIFA World Cup and Euro 1992, and then won the bronze medal in the 1994 FIFA World Cup in the United States. Thern also competed for Sweden at the 1988 Summer Olympics. Thern was the Sweden captain for seven years, between 1990 and 1997.

Coaching career
After he retired as a player he became head coach for IFK Värnamo between 2000 and 2001 and Halmstads BK 2001–2003.

In 2021, he led IFK Värnamo to promotion to Allsvenskan for the first time ever in the club's history.

Personal life
Jonas has a son, Simon, who is also a footballer. His daughter, Alicia, is an equestrian.

Career statistics

International
Appearances and goals by national team and year

International goals
Scores and results list Sweden's goal tally first.

Honours
Malmö

 Swedish Champion: 1986, 1988
 Allsvenskan: 1985, 1986, 1987, 1988, 1989
 Svenska Cupen: 1985–86, 1987–88

Benfica
 Primeira Divisão: 1990–91
 Supertaça Cândido de Oliveira: 1989
 European Cup runner-up: 1989–90

Rangers
Scottish Premier League: 1998–99
Sweden
 FIFA World Cup third place: 1994
Individual
 Guldbollen: 1989

References

External links

1967 births
Living people
Association football midfielders
Swedish footballers
Sweden international footballers
Sweden youth international footballers
Malmö FF players
FC Zürich players
S.L. Benfica footballers
S.S.C. Napoli players
A.S. Roma players
Rangers F.C. players
Allsvenskan players
Swiss Super League players
Primeira Liga players
Serie A players
Scottish Football League players
Scottish Premier League players
1990 FIFA World Cup players
1994 FIFA World Cup players
UEFA Euro 1992 players
Olympic footballers of Sweden
Footballers at the 1988 Summer Olympics
Swedish expatriate footballers
Expatriate footballers in Switzerland
Swedish expatriate sportspeople in Switzerland
Expatriate footballers in Portugal
Swedish expatriate sportspeople in Portugal
Expatriate footballers in Italy
Swedish expatriate sportspeople in Italy
Expatriate footballers in Scotland
Swedish expatriate sportspeople in Scotland
Swedish football managers
IFK Värnamo managers
Halmstads BK managers